This list contains buildings and structures on Broadway in Manhattan, New York City.

1-599 (Battery Place - W. Houston Street)

600-1499 (W. Houston St. - Times Square)

1500-1800 (Times Square - Columbus Circle)

North of Columbus Circle
 Museum of Biblical Art (1865 Broadway)
 Dauphin Hotel (demolished)
 Apple Bank Building (2100 Broadway)
 The Ansonia (2109 Broadway)
 Beacon Theatre (2124 Broadway)
 Hotel Beacon
 The Apthorp (2201 Broadway)
 First Baptist Church in the City of New York (near 2221 Broadway)
 Bretton Hall, Manhattan (2350 Broadway)
 Goddard Institute for Space Studies (2880 Broadway)
 Barnard College (3009 Broadway)
 Audubon Ballroom (3940 Broadway)
 United Palace (4140 Broadway)
 Dyckman House (4881 Broadway)
 Church of the Good Shepherd (4967 Broadway)

Further reading
 AIA Guide to New York City
 The Manhattan Guide: Greater New York Red Book ... A Complete ..., Volume 4

Broadway

Lower Manhattan
Midtown Manhattan
Upper West Side